The Union of Souls is the third album from U.K. rock band 3 Colours Red. It was released on Mighty Atom Records in 2004.

Eight of the ten tracks were recorded at the old BBC studios in Swansea, Wales with Joe Gibb (Funeral for a Friend); the other two ("Repeat to Fade" and "F.C.K.U") were recorded in London with Chris Sheldon (Foo fighters/ Therapy?).
The album was released on Mighty Atom Records in 2004 to critical acclaim but little commercial success. "Repeat to Fade" and "The World is Yours" were released as singles, the latter only as a download.

Track listing
"The Union of Souls" (Vuckovic)
"Repeat to Fade" (McCormack, Vuckovic)
"The World is Yours" (Vuckovic)
"Desensitise" (McCormack, Vuckovic)
"Counterfeit Jesus" (Vuckovic)
"Ceasefire" (Vuckovic)
"Made in Indonesia" (McCormack, Vuckovic)
"Land of Debris" (McCormack, Vuckovic)
"F.C.K.U" (Vuckovic)
"Lullaby" (McCormack, Vuckovic)

Personnel
3 Colours Red
 Pete Vuckovic - vocals, bass
 Chris McCormack - guitar
 Paul Grant - guitar
 Keith Baxter - drums
with:
 Jason Perry - vocals
 Martin McCarrick - vocals
 Alwyn Davies - vocals
Technical
 Joe Gibb - producer
 Chris Sheldon - producer
 Howie Weinberg - mastering

References

2004 albums
Albums produced by Chris Sheldon
3 Colours Red albums